Joel Kling (born 30 April 1997) is a former motorcycle speedway rider from Sweden. 

He represented Sweden at the 2018 Speedway of Nations and was the 2018 Swedish Junior Speedway Championship. In 2021, he announced his retirement at the age of 24.

References 

Living people
1997 births
Swedish speedway riders